Tulsidas Jadhav (25 January 1905 – 11 September 1999) was an Indian freedom fighter, political activist, social worker, farmer and member of Bombay Legislative Council and Lok Sabha.

Early life
Tulsidas Subhanrao Jadhav was born on 25 January 1905 at village Dahitane, Tal.Barshi, Dist. Solapur and was educated at Haribhai Deokarn High School, Solapur.

Family
He married Janabai Tulsidas Jadhav in 1913. He had two sons and four daughters. His elder son is Jaywant Jadhav.   and younger son was Yeshwant Jadhav. His one daughter Kalavati was married to Babasaheb Bhosale, who later became Chief Minister of Maharashtra and other daughter Nirmalatai Shankarrao Thokal was also MLA of Solapur City South constituency in 1972.

Profession
He was an agriculturist or farmer by profession.
He also established Bhogawati Sahakari Sugar Factory also called as Santanath Sugars at Santanath Nagar, Vairag,Tal. Barahi, Dist. Solapur, which is the earliest sugar factory in the Solapur region and one of the earliest in Maharashtra.

Political life
When Mahatma Gandhi initiated his Salt Satyagraha in 1930 young workers like Krisnaji Bhimrao Antrolikar, Tulsidas Jadhav and Jajuji came on the scene and became staunch followers of the Gandhian philosophy. In 1930 during time of communal  he was imprisoned in 1931, 1932, 1941 and 1942. From 1937-1939, 1946-1951 and 1951-57 he was a member of Bombay Legislative Assembly. Once during satyagraha, officer put a pistol on his chest and ordered his to leave but he refused to budge - luckily he was let-off. He was closely associated with Mahatma Gandhi and served as his secretary, when in Yerwada prison in 1932.

After independence, he left Congress in 1947 and with some other ex-congressman and formed the Peasants and Workers Party of India, of which he was one of founder member. He won the 1951 Bombay Assembly Election from Barshi-Madha constituency.

In 1957 he again joined Congress with his other PWP colleagues like Keshavrao Jedhe, Shankarrao More. He was given congress ticket but was lost in 1957 elections for 2nd Lok Sabha from Solapur constituency. He was elected as a member of 3rd Lok Sabha from Nanded from 1962–67 and as a member of the 4th Lok Sabha from Baramati as a Congress candidate. He was at times vocal opponent of Yashwantrao Chavan in many matters of policies and decisions for which in 1971 elections he was denied election ticket. He was part of radical camp in Maharashtra Congress of which other politicians included Shankarrao More and R. K. Khadlikar.

He also served as Parliamentary Committees on  Draft  Third  Five  Year  Plan. Among others he served also as a member of the Maharashtra Pradesh Congress Committee and was its General Secretary - 1957—60. He gave his services as a member of the Electricity Consultative Committee,  T.B. Board,  Leprosy Committee; Study Group on Road Safety In 1985, he was signatory to the "Apostle of Peace" award which was recognized  by Giani Zail Singh, President of India from 1982-1987, Dr. S. S. Mohapatra, Secretary General of India, and Tulsidas Jadhav, who at that time was President of the Parliamentary Center.

Social reformer
As a social reformer, he worked relentlessly for the upliftment of Harijan and Dalit communities beginning since decades of 1930 till his active life.

Death
He died on 11 September 1999 at Mumbai.

Memorials
In February 2009 a statue of Tulsidas Jadhav was erected at Mechanic Chowk to acknowledge his bravery act, when for three days from 9 to 11 May 1930, the law and order of town was maintained by Tulisdas, when all police officers had run out of town due to protests. It was inaugurated at the hands of  Sharad Pawar and Sushil Kumar Shinde.
Tulsidas Jadhav Adhyapak Vidhyalay at Sholapur is a teacher's training school named after him.
Maharashtrache shilpkaar - Tulsidas Jadhav(महाराष्ट्राचे शिल्पकार - तुलसीदास जाधव) is a biography published by Maharashtra Rajya Sahitya ani Sanskruti Mandal authored by Vyankatesh Kamatkar.

References

Indian independence activists from Maharashtra
Gandhians
India MPs 1962–1967
India MPs 1967–1970
Prisoners and detainees of British India
Social workers
Peasants and Workers Party of India politicians
Indian National Congress politicians from Maharashtra
People from Solapur
People from Nanded
1905 births
1999 deaths
People from Marathwada
Marathi politicians
Social workers from Maharashtra